Kedatuan (ancient or Sundanese spelling: kadatuan; Javanese romanization: kedaton) were historical semi-independent city-states or principalities throughout ancient Maritime Southeast Asia in present-day Indonesia, Malaysia, and the Philippines. In a modern Indonesian/Malay sense, they could be described as kingdoms or polities. The earliest written record mentioning the term kadatuan was the 7th-century Srivijayan Telaga Batu and Kota Kapur inscription from Sumatra, Indonesia.

Etymology

The term kadatuan in Old Malay means "the realm of the datu" or "the residence of the datu". Constructed from old Malay stem word datu with circumfix ke- -an to denote place. It derived from datu or datuk, an ancient Austronesian title and position for regional leader or elder that is used throughout Maritime Southeast Asia. It was mentioned in several inscriptions such as the 7th-century Srivijayan Old Malay Telaga Batu inscription and the 14th-century Sundanese Astana Gede inscription. In a wider sense, the term could refer to the whole principality, while in a smaller sense however, it could refer to the palace where the datu resides. The Kota Kapur inscription mentions "manraksa yan kadatuan çrivijaya" (to protect the Kadatuan of Srivijaya), thus Srivijaya is described as a kadatuan. From a Srivijayan perspective, the realm of the Kadatuan Srivijaya consisted of several wanua (settlements), each led by a datu (datuk), which means a community leader or elder. All of this realm was under the control of the central kadatuan, also led by a datu. The highest datu in Srivijaya was Dapunta Hyang.

Kedatuan are known and widely spread in the Malay-speaking region, including the east coast of Sumatra, the Minangkabau lands, the Malay peninsula, the Borneo coast and the Philippine archipelago. In Javanese, the term ratu is used instead of datu, thus in Java karaton, keraton or kraton is used instead of kedaton to describe the residence of regional leader. The term is also known in Java as kedaton, the meaning however, has shifted to architectural term to refer to the inner compound of the living quarter inside the keraton (palace) complex. For example, there is the kedaton complex within the central part of Keraton Surakarta palace in Central Java.

As outlined in the Boxer Codex, a Spanish-manuscript describing the ancient customs and traditions of the Philippines, Kadatuan referred to the family members of Royal Nobility - known as the Kadatuan clan. This persists to modern-times, with present-day members of the Kadatuan royal family still inhabiting the province of Mindanao.

Political relations

Smaller kedatuan often became subordinated to more powerful neighboring kedatuan, which in turn were subordinate to a central king (maharaja). The more powerful kedatuan sometimes grew to become powerful kingdoms, and occasionally tried to liberate themselves from their suzerain and sometimes enjoyed times of independence, and in turn might subjugate neighboring kedatuan. Kedatuan, large and small, often shifted allegiance, or paid tribute to more than one powerful neighbor.

Some kedatuan, such as Srivijaya, rose to become empires. It is suggested that during its early formation, Srivijaya was a collection or some kind of federation consisting of several kadatuans (local principalities), all swearing allegiance to the central ruling kadatuan ruled by the Srivijayan maharaja.

See also
 Mueang, similar concept in mainland Southeast Asia, especially in Thailand and Laos
 Mandala, political model in ancient Southeast Asia
 Barangay, specific term for the same system of independent and semi-independent city-states used in the Philippines

References

Types of administrative division